The 2016 Campeonato Paraibano de Futebol was the 106th edition of Paraíba's top professional football league. The competition began on 30 January and ended on 15 June. Campinense were champions, for the 20th time.

Format
The competition was divided into three stages.

In the first stage, the ten teams were split into two groups. Each team played all the teams from the other group, home and away, for a total of ten games.

In the second stage, the top three teams from each group played off in a single round over two legs. The draw was pre–determined based on finishing positions in the first stage. The bottom two teams from each group played each other home and away, for a total of six games, with the bottom two teams in this phase relegated to the second division.

In the final stage, the three winning teams in the second stage, along with the eliminated team with the best overall record in the competition, played the Semi Final over two legs, and the winners played the final over two legs.

Qualification
The champions qualify to participate in the 2017 Copa do Brasil. The two best placed teams (other than Botafogo-PB) qualify to participate in the 2016 Campeonato Brasileiro Série D and 2017 Campeonato Brasileiro Série D. The two finalists qualify to participate in the 2017 Copa do Nordeste.

Participating teams

First stage

Standings

Group A

Group B

Second stage
The top three teams from each group in the first stage play each other over two legs. In each tie, the better performing team will have home advantage in the second leg.

The first legs will be played on 10 April 2016, the second legs on 24 April 2016.

|}

Relegation stage
The bottom two teams from each group in the first stage play in league tournament, home and away, with the two worst performing teams being relegated to the Second Division.

Final stage
In each tie, the team which has the best record so far in the competition has home advantage in the second leg. Sousa qualified as the  "lucky loser" for being losing team in the second stage with the best overall record in the competition.

Semi Final first leg games were scheduled to take place on 1 May and 8 May 2016, with Second leg games scheduled to take place on 8 and 11 May 2016. However, an injunction filed by Treze at the Superior Tribunal de Justiça Desportiva (STJD) the Superior Court of Sports Justice, caused the first leg of the game between Campinense and CSP to be postponed until after a hearing at the Tribunal de Justiça Desportiva da Paraíba (TJD-PB) (Sports Court of Paraíba) on 11 May.

Bracket

References

Paraíba
2016